State University of New York at Morrisville (formerly Morrisville State College) or SUNY Morrisville is a public college with two locations in New York, one in Morrisville and one in Norwich. It is part of the State University of New York system. It offers 23 bachelor's degrees, 52 associate degrees, and three certificate programs, and is accredited by the Middle States Commission on Higher Education.

Location 
Morrisville is adjacent to the towns of Cazenovia,  to the west, and Hamilton,  to the east.

Research

Industrial hemp
SUNY Morrisville was one of the first campuses to hold a license to grow industrial hemp for grain and fiber research applications. This research program is being led by Agronomy professor Dr. Gilbert Jenkins and Morrisville students. While Industrial Hemp is very responsive to nitrogen inputs in terms on increased grain production, at the same time, fiber quality may decrease with high N inputs. We are looking to develop a grain yield response curve for nitrogen fertilization, test a variety of fertilization timing options, and sources of N fertilizer to maximize grain production.  Fiber quantity and quality will be measured to determine if it is possible to harvest high quality fiber from a dual purpose crop, or whether nitrogen recommendations are divergent for fiber and grain production purposes. 

Recently the college announced the creation of a cannabis industry minor.

Seahorses
SUNY Morrisville Aquatic Science and Aquaculture Program houses a breeding colony of Hippocampus erectus, the lined seahorse, and is currently working on experiments that address larval seahorse health and the conservation of seahorses.

Biofuels 
The New York State Senate awarded $4 million for the creation of the New York Center for Liquid Biofuels at SUNY Morrisville with a facility based in Cortland County. The grant for the center will help fund a biodiesel infrastructure in New York State through the construction of an oilseed crushing and biodiesel processing plant and extensive research in the use of biofuels and byproducts.

Weather station
A fully automated, self-contained weather station has been in operation at SUNY Morrisville since 2002. The weather station collects weather data which is used in support of various college projects, including alternative energy projects.

Buildings

Morrisville campus
The Morrisville campus includes over 50 buildings spread across an area adjacent to US 20. Morrisville is a small town, however a bus on a major route arrives and departs campus twice each day.

This includes twelve residence halls, split into four different locations:
 The "Iroquois Quad" includes Cayuga, Mohawk, Onondaga, and Oneida halls, and is located in the center of campus.
 The "Pond Quad" includes Helyar, Fountain View, Stewart, South, and West halls, and is located on the east side of campus.  It is named for the Helyar Pond, which is overlooked by the dorms.
 East Hall, a quiet dorm that consists of small suites of rooms, is located in the northeast corner of the campus.
 The Morrisville Commons and Morrisville Commons II, suite-style dorms completed in 2006 and 2009 respectively, are on the far south end of campus. The Commons are owned by the Morrisville Auxiliary Corporation, rather than Morrisvile State College itself.

The academic buildings are spread out across the entire campus.  They include:
 Bailey Hall, home to the Nursing Program
 Bicknell Hall, contains a taxidermy museum and classrooms for the Agriculture and Natural Resources Program.
 Brooks Hall, home to the Hospitality Programs, gaming and casino lab, tour agency, University Police and the Madison County Tourism Office
 Donald G. Butcher Library is a multi-purpose building that provides a wide set of traditional and electronic library services and is home to a gallery space that features the work of students and local artists.  Also included in the building are offices for the School of General Studies, the Academic Enrichment Center which provides tutoring services, and an ancillary office for Morrisville native Dr. Raymond Stantz.  
 Charlton Hall, which primarily houses the School of Business.
 Crawford Hall, containing most of the large lecture halls on campus and the School of Liberal Arts.
 Galbreath Hall, used mostly by the School of Science, Technology and Health Studies, and where this school's Dean's office is located.
 Marshall Hall, home to the School of Agriculture.
 Sheila Johnson Design Center, home of the Architectural Studies and Design program.
 Shannon Hall, home to the Massage Therapy Program
 Wood Technology Building, houses equipment for use in the Wood Technology and Residential Construction programs.

Norwich campus
A branch campus in Norwich, New York offers programs in business, technologies, liberal arts/education transfer, and nursing to Chenango area residents and employers.

Athletics
The sixteen varsity athletic teams of SUNY Morrisville are known as the Mustangs. Sports with both men's and women's teams include basketball, cross country, ice hockey, lacrosse, and soccer; in addition to a men's football team; women's softball, field hockey, and volleyball teams; and two co-ed equitation teams, hunt seat and Western. SUNY Morrisville is a member of the NCAA Division III and most of its sports are primarily affiliated with the United East Conference (formerly known as the North Eastern Athletic Conference, or NEAC). The Mustangs are additionally affiliated with the Empire 8 conference for football, the State University of New York Athletic Conference (SUNYAC) for field hockey and men's ice hockey, and the Northeast Women's Hockey League (NEWHL) for women's ice hockey.

Affiliates

Morrisville Auxiliary Corporation
The Morrisville Auxiliary Corporation is a non-profit corporation that provides dining and other services to the Morrisville campus and elsewhere including SUNY-ESF. As a separate corporation, it is not bound by the same rules that the state imposes on the SUNY schools themselves, namely it is not bound by the same level of openness that public institutions are required to maintain.

SUNY Syracuse EOC
The Syracuse Educational Opportunity Center (SUNY Syracuse EOC) has been administered by SUNY Morrisville since 1973.

Horse drug testing
Since 2010, Morrisville has also been home to the laboratory that tests racehorses for illegal performance enhancing drugs.

Notable alumni
 Oluwale Bamgbose, professional Mixed Martial Artist, formerly competing in the UFC's middleweight division
 Michele Anne Harris, woman whose 2001 disappearance led to her husband Cal being tried for her murder four times in ten years before being acquitted.
 Curtis Johnson - former NFL defensive end
 Jon Jones - mixed martial artist, the former Ultimate Fighting Championship Light Heavyweight Champion Current Heavyweight Champion.
 Aljamain Sterling  - two-time All-American wrestler; professional Mixed Martial Artist, current UFC Bantamweight Champion
 Wendall Williams - former Houston Texans wide receiver

References

External links
 
 Official athletics website

 
U.S. Route 20
Universities and colleges in Madison County, New York
Education in Chenango County, New York
Agricultural universities and colleges in the United States
Public universities and colleges in New York (state)
1908 establishments in New York (state)
Educational institutions established in 1908